Kanasiragi (Dargwa: Къянасирагьи) is a rural locality (a selo) in Sergokalinsky District, Republic of Dagestan, Russia. The population was 731 as of 2010. There are 3 streets.

Geography 
Kanasiragi is located 34 km south of Sergokala (the district's administrative centre) by road. Mugri and Tsurai are the nearest rural localities.

Nationalities 
Dargins live there.

Famous residents 
 Muslimbek Kemtsurov (People's Artist of Dagestan, theater actor)
 Abdurazak Murtazaliyev (poet)

References 

Rural localities in Sergokalinsky District